Conrad Gérard Théberge (December 18, 1930 – May 1, 2000) was a Canadian ice hockey player who competed in the 1956 Winter Olympics.

Théberge was a member of the Kitchener-Waterloo Dutchmen who won the bronze medal for Canada in ice hockey at the 1956 Winter Olympics.

References

External links

Gerry Théberge's profile at Sports Reference.com

1930 births
2000 deaths
Canadian ice hockey left wingers
Ice hockey people from Quebec
Ice hockey players at the 1956 Winter Olympics
Medalists at the 1956 Winter Olympics
Olympic bronze medalists for Canada
Olympic ice hockey players of Canada
Sportspeople from Saint-Hyacinthe